"Motor City (I Get Lost)" is the first single from Australian supergroup Company of Strangers. The single was released in July 1992 and peaked at number 26 in Australia in September 1992. It features the vocals of Daryl Braithwaite and James Reyne.

At the ARIA Music Awards of 1993, the song was nominated for 'breakthrough artist single' award, but lost out to "Ordinary Angels" by Frente!.

Video

A video was also created. James Reyens plays a guitar with various industries in the backgrounds and Daryl Braithwaite drives a car.

Track listings
 CD Single
 "Motor City (I Get Lost)" - 4:45
 "Damn California" - 4:51

Chart positions

Weekly charts

External links

References

1992 songs
1992 singles
Columbia Records singles
Company of Strangers (band) songs
Songs written by Simon Hussey
Songs about Detroit